Lebanese Greek Orthodox Christians (Arabic: المسيحية الأرثوذكسية الرومية في لبنان) refers to Lebanese people who are adherents of the Greek Orthodox Church of Antioch in Lebanon, which is an autocephalous Greek Orthodox Church within the wider communion of Eastern Orthodox Christianity, and is the second-largest Christian denomination in Lebanon after the Maronite Christians.

Lebanese Greek Orthodox Christians are believed to constitute about 8% of the total population of Lebanon. Most of the Greek Orthodox Christians live either in the capital city of Beirut, the Metn hinterland, the Hasbayya and Rashayya districts in the southeast, and the North Governorate, in the Koura region (south of Tripoli) and Akkar.

Under the consensus of the unwritten agreement known as the National Pact among the different political leaders of Lebanon, the Deputy Speaker of the Parliament of Lebanon and the Deputy Prime Minister of Lebanon are assumed to be Greek Orthodox Christians.

History

The Greek Orthodox Church of Antioch adheres to the Eastern Orthodox Church, which is composed of several autocephalous jurisdictions united by common doctrine and by their use of the Byzantine rite. They are the second largest Christian denomination within Christianity in Lebanon. Historically, these churches grew out of the four Eastern Patriarchates (Jerusalem, Antioch, Alexandria, and Constantinople) of the original five major episcopal sees (the Pentarchy) of the Roman Empire, which included Rome. The final split between Rome and the Eastern Churches, who came to oppose the views and claims of the Popes of Rome, took place in 1054. From that time, with the exception of a brief period of reunion in the fifteenth century, the Eastern Churches have continued to reject the claims of the Patriarchate of Rome (the Catholic Church) to universal supremacy and have rejected the concept of papal infallibility. Doctrinally, the main point at issue between the Eastern and Western Churches is that of the procession of the Holy Spirit, and there are also divergences in ritual and discipline.

The Greek Orthodox include many free-holders, and the community is less dominated by large landowners than other Christian denominations. In present-day Lebanon, Eastern Orthodox Christians have become increasingly urbanized, and form a major part of the commercial and professional class of Beirut and other cities. Many are found in the Southeast (Nabatieh/Beqaa) and North, near Tripoli. They are highly educated and well-versed in finance. The Greek Orthodox church has become known in the Arab world, possibly because it exists in various parts of the region. The Greek Orthodox church has often served as a bridge between Lebanese Christians and the Arab countries.

Lebanese Greek Orthodox Christians have a long and continuous association with Eastern Orthodox Churches in European countries like Greece, Cyprus, Russia, Ukraine, Bulgaria, Serbia, and Romania. The church exists in many parts of the Arab world and Greek Orthodox Christians have often been noted; historically, it has had fewer dealings with Western countries than the Maronite Church, but it does have strong connections to Russia and Greece. The Lebanese Greek Orthodox Christians are believed to constitute about 8% of the total population of Lebanon, including the Palestinian Greek Orthodox community, many of whom have been given Lebanese citizenship.

Greek Orthodox Christians support a variety of political parties and factions, including non-sectarian parties such as the Syrian Social Nationalist Party, the Lebanese Communist Party, and the Democratic Left Movement; and mostly Christian parties such as the Free Patriotic Movement, the Marada Movement, the Lebanese Forces, and the Kataeb.

Greek Orthodox Christian settlements 
In Lebanon, the Greek Orthodox Christians are found in Beirut, the Southeast (Nabatieh/Beqaa) and North, near Tripoli, Koura, and also in Akkar, Batroun, Matn, Aley, Zahlé, Miniyeh-Danniyeh, Hasbaya, Baabda, Marjeyoun, Tripoli, Rashaya, Byblos, and Zgharta.

Cities and towns with a majority Greek Orthodox population in Lebanon
Abou Mizan, Chrine, Achrafieh, Amioun, Rahbeh, Kousba, Anfeh, Deddeh, Kfaraakka, Aaba, Afsdik, Bdebba, Batroumine, Bishmizzine, Btourram, Bkeftine, Bsarma, Btaaboura, Charbila, Darchmezzine, Fih, Kaftoun, Kelhat, Kfarhata, Kfarhazir, Kfarsaroun, Ras Maska, Miniara, Cheikh Mohammad, Zawarib, Hamat, Douma, Dhour El Choueir, Bteghrine, Mansourieh, Broummana, Kafarakab, Bhamdoun, Souk El Gharb, Marjayoun, Deir Mimas, Deir Dalloum, Hmairah, Tal Abbas, Cheikh Taba, Rachaya Al Foukhar, Aita al-Foukhar, Jeddayel, Gebrayel, Mhaidthe (Bikfaya) and others.

Cities and towns with an important Greek Orthodox minority
Ras Beirut, Tripoli, El Mina, Chekka, Bourj Hammoud, Zahleh, Halba, Batroun, Bikfaya, Baskinta, Antelias, Ras el Matn, Aley, Bechamoun, Machgara, Hasbaya, Kfeir, Niha Bekaa, Riit, and others.

Beirut was once ruled by seven prominent Greek Orthodox Christian families that formed Beirut's High Society for centuries: Trad, Geday, Fernaine, Araman, Bustros, Sursock, Fayyad, and Tueini.

Lebanese Greek Orthodox-born notables

Paul Anka – singer, songwriter and actor
Lydia Canaan – singer-songwriter poet, humanitarian, activist, and pioneering first rock star of the Middle East
Farid Makari – politician, former Lebanese Minister, Member of Parliament, Deputy Speaker of the Lebanese Parliament
Charles Debbas – former president (1926–1934)
Mounir Abou Fadel – former Deputy Speaker of the Parliament, Member of the Parliament
Marcos Baghdatis – tennis player
Charles Malik – former president of the United Nations General Assembly and Minister of Foreign Affairs
Antoun Saadeh – philosopher and founder of the Syrian Social Nationalist Party
Antoine Andraos – politician and a vice-president of the Movement of the Future
Elias Murr – former Deputy Prime Minister
Michel Murr – former Deputy Prime Minister
Michel Sassine – former Lebanese Minister, Member of the Parliament, Deputy Speaker of the Lebanese Parliament, and Deputy Prime Minister of Lebanon
Mikhail Naimy – poet, novelist, and philosopher, famous for his spiritual writings, notably The Book of Mirdad
Elia Abu Madi – poet
George Antonius – author and diplomat, pioneering historian of Arab nationalism
George N. Atiyeh – librarian and scholar
Souha Bechara – resistance fighter and member of the Lebanese Communist Party
Yousef Beidas – banker
Marwan Abou Fadel – former MP of Mount Lebanon, co-founder of the Lebanese Democratic Party
Gabrielle Bou Rached – model and actress
Jurji Zaydan – novelist, journalist, editor and teacher, most noted for his creation of the magazine Al-Hilal, which he used to serialize his 23 historical novels. Also reputed to be the first Arab nationalist. 
Elie Ferzli – politician
Fawaz Gerges – professor and author
Farid Habib – member of the Lebanese Forces party
Nicolas Hayek – entrepreneur, co-founder, CEO and chairman of the board of the Swatch Group
Saint Joseph of Damascus – priest and educator who was canonized as a saint in 1993
Samir Kassir – professor of history at Saint-Joseph University, journalist and a prominent leftist political activist
Wehbe Katicha – politician and former general in the Lebanese Army
Elias Khoury – novelist, playwright, critic, and a prominent public intellectual
Giselle Khoury – talk show host on the Al Arabiya news channel
Jacobo Majluta Azar – former president of the Dominican Republic
Mikhail Mishaqa – first historian of modern Ottoman Syria
Tarek Mitri – scholar and independent politician
Samir Mouqbel – Deputy Prime Minister of Lebanon
Ibrahim Najjar – lawyer and politician
Octavia Nasr – journalist who covers Middle-Eastern affairs
Mona Ofeich – politician
Assi Rahbani – composer, musician, and producer
Ziad Rahbani – producer, lyricist, composer, arranger, orchestra conductor, pianist, and singer
Mansour Rahbani – composer, musician, poet, and producer
Raphael of Brooklyn – first Orthodox bishop to be consecrated in North America
Salim Saade – politician and member of the Syrian Social Nationalist Party
Christina Sawaya – beauty queen
Cochrane Sursock – philanthropist, a prominent public figure, and an advocate of the arts in Lebanon
Nassim Nicholas Taleb – essayist and scholar whose work focuses on problems of randomness, probability, and uncertainty
Petro Trad – lawyer, politician, and former president of the French Mandate of Lebanon for a brief period (22 July 1943 – 21 September 1943)
Gebran Tueni – journalist and a figure of the Arab Renaissance
Ghassan Tueni – veteran journalist, politician, and diplomat who headed An Nahar, one of the Arab World's leading newspapers
Nayla Tueni – journalist and politician
Karim Azkoul – diplomat and philosopher
Jad Azkoul – musician
Zeina Mina – olympic athlete director of the games of the Francophonie. She holds a doctorate in Sciences and Techniques of Physical and Sports Activities.

Gallery

See also

 Greek Orthodox Archdiocese of Beirut
 Arab Orthodox
 Antiochian Greek Christians
 Greek Orthodox Church of Antioch
 Saint George Greek Orthodox Cathedral, Beirut
 Christianity in Lebanon
 University of Balamand

References

Sources